Gerald Stenhouse Jemmott (born March 22, 1946, in the Morrisania section of the Bronx, New York City) is an American bass guitarist. Jemmott was one of the chief session bass guitarists of the late 1960s and early 1970s, working with many of the period's well-known soul, blues and jazz artists.

Biography
Jemmott, who has won two Grammy Awards as a bassist, began playing acoustic bass at the age of eleven after he discovered Paul Chambers. Jemmott began his career at age twelve. After switching to bass guitar, he was discovered by saxophonist King Curtis in 1967. With his connection through Curtis to Atlantic Records, he soon began recording with other Atlantic recording artists, including Aretha Franklin, Ray Charles, Wilson Pickett, the Rascals, Roberta Flack, and Margie Joseph. He also recorded with B.B. King, Freddie King, Chuck Berry, Otis Rush, Champion Jack Dupree, Mike Bloomfield and accompanied Herbie Hancock, Freddie Hubbard, Erroll Garner, Les McCann, Eddie Harris, Houston Person, George Benson, Archie Shepp, Lionel Hampton, Herbie Mann, Eddie Palmieri and Charles Earland. He played the bass line on the song  "Mr. Bojangles" and contributed to B.B. King's "The Thrill Is Gone". Jemmott and Duane Allman would fly down to Muscle Shoals, to record for Atlantic. In 1971 King Curtis recorded his Rhythm & Blues hit, "Live at Filmore West" with Jerry Jemmott, Bernard Purdie, Billy Preston, and other members of the Kingpins. 
After a near fatal auto accident in 1972, that involved singer Roberta Flack and guitarist, Cornell Dupree  Jemmott put up the bass due to the injuries sustained, but would return in 1975 in the midst of the closure of many of the recording studios, due to emergence of compact home recording studios that utilized the syncing of the drum machine with the synthesizer, the precursor to the decline of recording industry and the emerging acceptance of the sound of digital recordings. He continued to work in film and theater as an arranger and conductor with John Williams and The Boston Pops. He was cited as a major influence by bassist Jaco Pastorius who incorporated Jemmott's funk bass lines into his own style. Jemmott hosted the instructional video Modern Electric Bass (1985) which featured advice from Pastorius.

Jemmott began his solo career in 1978, playing jazz, blues, R&B, reggae, and soul as Jerry Jemmott & Souler Energy, a group that over the years included Steve Berrios, Eric Gale, Neal Creque, Patience Higgins, Lou Marini, Seldon Powell, Bernard Purdie, Arlen Roth, and Melvin Sparks. Later he formed 「Jerry Jemmott's The Right Reverend Jakie Neckbone Jubilee Special」 and performed a mix of his original "cool groove" songs with his classic hits in addition to presenting his "Soul Kitchen" improvisation workshops and clinics. That band members were singers Tina Fabrique, Connie Fredericks - Malone, Frankie Paris, Angel Rissoff, Catherine Russell, and Stan Wright. Drummers Tony Thunder Smith, Tom Kaelin, and others. During this period he was also a member of the Jimmy Owens Quartet, who made several trips to Europe, The Middle East and Africa for the U.S State Department, along with Dizzy Gillespie, the Heath Brothers, and Sonny Fortune . The group included guitarist Eric "Fabulous J" Johnson, drummer Daryl Washington, brother of Grover Washington Jr. During this period of creative he got drummer Herb Lovelle out of retirement to record Robert Johnson's music for producers Gene Heimlich and Clark Dimond. The album was called "Incarnation" and it featured vocalist/actor Tucker Smallwood and guitarist Arlen Roth, guitarist Pat Conte, TC James on keyboards and Jemmott on bass. Of note it was not released until 1994 with non existent exposure, but will emerge in 2019 as The Incarnation Blues Band On Soulitude Records.

Jemmott recorded solo albums for P-Vine Records, Caught in the Low Beam and The New York View, and Make It Happen! for WhatchaGonnaDo Records. He has written articles, books, and released audio and video bass instruction materials.
He is the recipient of the 2001 Bass Player magazine's Lifetime Achievement Award and Chairman of the Electric Bass Department at the Richard Davis Foundation for Young Bassists.

In 2006 he joined Gregg Allman's backing band ("Gregg Allman & Friends") in addition to Cornell Dupree's Soul Survivors. That same year, he was one of many guests at The Allman Brothers Band's 40th anniversary at the Beacon Theatre in New York City. In 2014 he rejoined Aretha Franklin on the David Letterman Show, Rolling in The Deep. He developed a universally recognizable ColorSoundMusic Learning System envisioned by Herb Lovelle that he teaches at his Clinics and Workshops.

Discography

Solo
 New York View (P-Vine, 1995)
 Make It Happen! (Whatchagonnado?, 2005)
 Home Cookin'   (Whatchagonnado?, 2006)
 Bass on the Case (Whachagonnado?, 2009)
 Addiction (Whachagonnado?, 2014)

As sideman
With Nina Simone
 Nina Simone Sings The Blues (RCA Records SP-3789, 1967)
 Ain't Got No, I Got Life (RCA Records – single, 1968)
With Erma Franklin
 Piece of My Heart (Shout Records S-221, 1967)
With Lorraine Ellison
 Stay With Me Baby (Warner Bros. Records, 1966)
 You Don't Know Nothing About Love (Warner Bros. Records, 1966)
With King Curtis
 Instant Groove (Atco,33-293, 1969)
 Live at Fillmore West (Atco 33-359, 1971)
 Everybody's Talkin' (Atco 33-385, 1971)
With King Curtis and Champion Jack Dupree

 Blues at Montreux (Atlantic SD1637, 1973)

With Lightnin' Rod
 Hustlers Convention (Celluloid, 1973)
With Carly Simon
 Carly Simon (Elektra Records, 1971)
With Al Kooper
 You Never Know Who Your Friends Are (Columbia Records, 1969)
With Aretha Franklin
 Aretha Now (Atlantic Records, 1968)
 Soul '69 (Atlantic Records, 1969)
 This Girl's In Love With You (Atlantic Records, 1970)
 Hey Now Hey (The Other Side of the Sky) (Atlantic Records, 1973)
With Janis Ian
 Who Really Cares (Verve, 1969)
With Freddie Hubbard
 A Soul Experiment (Atlantic Records SD-1526, 1968)
With George Benson
 Tell it Like it Is (A&M Records, 1968)
 The Other Side of Abbey Road (A&M Records, 1970)
With Wilson Pickett
 The Midnight Mover (Atlantic Records, 1968)
 Hey Jude (Atlantic Records, 1969)
With Gil Scott Heron
 The Revolution Will Not Be Televised (Flying Dutchman, 1971)
With Mike Bloomfield and Al Kooper
 Fillmore East: The Lost Concert Tapes 12–13–68 (Columbia Records, 2003)
With Candido Camero
 Beautiful (Blue Note Records, 1970)
With Hank Crawford
 Mr. Blues Plays Lady Soul (Atlantic Records, 1969)
With Ben E. King
 Supernatural (Atlantic Records, 1975)
With Archie Shepp
 Attica Blues (ABC Records AS-9222, 1972)
With Eddie Harris
 Second Movement (Atlantic Records, 1971) with Les McCann
With Richard Groove Holmes
 Comin' on Home (Blue Note Records, 1971)
 American Pie (Groove Merchant, 1972)
With B.B. King  

° Live and Well (ABC Records, 1968)
 Completely Well (ABC Records, 1969)
 Indianola Mississippi Seeds (ABC Records, 1970)
 Guess Who (ABC Records, 1972)
With Herbie Mann 
 Turtle Bay (Atlantic Records, 1973)
With Laura Nyro
 Walk the Dog and Light the Light (Columbia Records, 1993)
With Houston Person
 Houston Express (Prestige, 1970) 
With Shirley Scott
 Shirley Scott & the Soul Saxes (Atlantic Records, 1969)
With The Thad Jones & Mel Lewis Orchestra
 New Life (Horizon, SP-707, 1976)

References

External links 
 Official site

1946 births
African-American guitarists
American funk bass guitarists
American male bass guitarists
American jazz bass guitarists
American jazz double-bassists
Male double-bassists
American music arrangers
American rhythm and blues bass guitarists
American session musicians
Guitarists from New York City
Jazz fusion bass guitarists
Living people
People from the Bronx
20th-century American bass guitarists
Jazz musicians from New York (state)
21st-century double-bassists
20th-century American male musicians
21st-century American male musicians
American male jazz musicians
20th-century African-American musicians
21st-century African-American musicians